Bushland Independent School District is a public school district based in the community of Bushland, Texas (USA).

In addition to Bushland, the district also serves the town of Bishop Hills, as well as portions of Amarillo along and west of Coulter St. north of Interstate 40. The district's territory covers all of western and a large part of northern and northeastern Potter County as well as a small portion of northern Randall County.   In 2009, the school district was rated "academically acceptable" by the Texas Education Agency.

Schools
The district has three campuses:
Bushland High School (Grades 9-12)
Bushland Middle School (Grades 5-8)
Bushland Elementary School (Grades PK-4)

References

External links
Bushland ISD
Bushland High School

School districts in Potter County, Texas
School districts in Randall County, Texas
School districts in Amarillo, Texas